La chabola de la Hechicera (in Basque: Sorginaren Txabola, "The Witch's Hut") is a dolmen group located in Elvillar, Álava, in the Basque Country in Spain. Three large vertical stones support a large horizontal flat stone. Nine large stones form a chamber in a polygonal shape. The corridor is made of five stones, and is divided into two. The site was probably a funerary construction to hold the remains of the people in the settlement.

It was discovered in 1935 by Álvaro de Gortázar in a fair state of preservation. Jose Miguel Barandiaran explored it partially in 1936, finding two stone percutors ("percutor" is Spanish for the striking hammer of a firearm), a polished axe of ophite, fragments of pottery and human remains. The stone lying on top was found broken into three parts, but it was restored and replaced in its original position. The findings are preserved in a museum in nearby Laguardia, Álava. 

Before festivities in August, an Akelarre party is celebrated around the dolmen.

References
Chabola de la Hechicera, by José Miguel de Barandiarán in the Spanish-language Auñamendi Encyclopedia.

See also
Megalithic monument
Basque Prehistory

1935 archaeological discoveries
Buildings and structures in the Basque Country (autonomous community)
Álava
Dolmens in Spain
Tourist attractions in Álava
Bien de Interés Cultural landmarks in Álava
Bronze Age sites in Europe
Archaeology of Álava